Northern cricket team is a domestic cricket team in Pakistan representing Islamabad Capital Territory, Gilgit-Baltistan and Azad Jammu & Kashmir. It competes in domestic first-class, List A and T20 cricket competitions, namely the Quaid-e-Azam Trophy, Pakistan Cup and National T20 Cup. The team is operated by the Northern Cricket Association.

History
The team was introduced as a part of the new domestic structure announced by the Pakistan Cricket Board (PCB) on 31 August 2019.
On 3 September 2019, PCB confirmed the first squad of the team.

2019/20 season
Northern were runners-up in the 2019–20 Quaid-e-Azam Trophy, and won the National T20 Cup, defeating Balochistan by 52 runs in the final. The Pakistan Cup was cancelled this season due to the covid-19 pandemic.

2020/21 season
Northern finished in fifth place in the Quaid-e-Azam Trophy, and were losing semi-finalists in both the Pakistan Cup and the National T20 Cup.

Structure

As of 2019, domestic cricket in Pakistan was reorganised into six regional teams (on provincial lines).

A three tier bottom-up system is in operation with the Tier 1 teams participating in the Quaid-e-Azam Trophy (First Class), Pakistan Cup (List A) and National T20 Cup (Regional T20). The Tier 2 teams participate in the City Cricket Association Tournament whilst the Tier 3 teams participate in various local tournaments as both tiers feed players to the Tier 1 team. 

 Tier 1: Northern
 Tier 2: Rawalpindi, Attock, Jhelum, Chakwal, Muzaffarabad, Kotli, Islamabad, Mirpur, Gilgit-Baltistan, Poonch & Bagh.
 Tier 3: Various Clubs & Schools.

Current squad
Players with international caps are listed in bold. List of players to have played for the First XI in FC, List A and T20 in the 2022-23 Season   

Northern First XI

Northern Second XI
Players with international caps are listed in bold. List of players to have played for the Second XI in 4 day, One Day and T20 in the 2022-23 Season

Coaching and managing staff 
Cricket Association Coaches for Domestic Season 2021-22

See also
 Balochistan cricket team
 Central Punjab cricket team
 Khyber Pakhtunkhwa cricket team
 Sindh cricket team
 Southern Punjab cricket team

References

Pakistani first-class cricket teams